Shri Satyavijaya Tirtha (died 1737) was an Indian Hindu philosopher, guru, and scholar. He was the successor of Satyapurna Tirtha and the 23rd pontiff of Uttaradi Math since Madhvacharya, the chief proponent and the one who rejuvenated this Dvaita philosophy and served the pontificate from 1726–1737.

Biography 
According to hagiographies, Satyavijaya Tirtha was born Pandurangi Balacharya in a prominent family of scholars to Pandurangi Srinivasacharya. Satyavijaya Tirtha was given sanyasa by Satyapurna Tirtha with specific instructions that he, in turn, should hand over the Samsthana to his asrama senior Satyapriya Tirtha. Since Satyavijaya Tirtha was older in age he was given opportunity to be the Pontiff of Uttaradi Math after Satyapurna Tirtha. Satyavijaya Tirtha served as the pontiff of Uttaradi Math from 1726 - 1737. During this time according to manuscripts which dates to 1726 A.D Satyavijaya Tirtha was honoured in Varadharaja Perumal Temple, Kanchipuram with certain privileges. In 1737 he handed over the pontificate to Satyapriya Tirtha. He died in 1737 and his mortal remains are enshrined in a mutt in Satya Vijaya Nagaram (Arani) on the banks of river Kaveri.

Legacy
The village where his Brindavana (tomb) is located is named after him as Satya Vijaya Nagaram in Tamil Nadu.

References

Bibliography

External links
Sri Satyavijaya Tirtha Biography on uttaradimath.org

1737 deaths
Madhva religious leaders
Dvaita Vedanta
Dvaitin philosophers
Uttaradi Math
Scholars from Karnataka
History of Karnataka